William Dell Perley (February 6, 1838 – July 15, 1909) was a farmer and politician from western Canada.

William had an extensive political career, he ran at least twice for the House of Commons of Canada in Sunbury electoral district as a Conservative being defeated both times in 1878 and 1882 in hotly contested and very close elections.

He moved out west to the Regina area in the Northwest Territories and ran for the Legislative Assembly of Northwest Territories in the brand new Qu'Appelle electoral district in the 1885 Northwest Territories election and won the second of two seats in the district.

He resigned his territorial seat two years prior to running in the 1887 Canadian federal election when he won one of the first Northwest Territories seats in the House of Commons of Canada.

Perley served in the House of Commons for a year before being appointed to the Senate of Canada on the advice of John A. Macdonald. He served as a Senator for the Northwest Territories, and then the province of Saskatchewan after it was created in 1905.

He died while still in office in 1909.

His son, Ernest Perley, would also become a parliamentarian.

External links
 

Members of the Legislative Assembly of the Northwest Territories
Members of the House of Commons of Canada from the Northwest Territories
Canadian senators from the Northwest Territories
1838 births
1909 deaths